= National Alliance of Vietnamese American Service Agencies =

The National Alliance of Vietnamese American Service Agencies (NAVASA) is an American organization founded and incorporated as a non-profit in 1985. Duong Hong Duc serves as chairman of the board, of 34 community-based (CBOs) and faith-based organizations (FBOs).

== Mission ==
Its agenda is economic self-sufficiency and active citizenship for Vietnamese-Americans through full participation in the political system. It is committed to assisting its affiliates address the linguistic, social, economic, and civic needs facing community members in their specific localities.

Its mission is to empower the Vietnamese-American community in the United States and facilitate the transition of Vietnamese refugees and immigrants from dependency to self-sufficiency.

It works with national and local affiliates to support its member agencies; to strengthen national advocacy capability and, to promote the integration of the Vietnamese American community into American society. The member agencies work with refugees and immigrants (both Vietnamese and non-Vietnamese) at the local and regional level while NAVASA coordinates and develops national programs, initiatives and resources.

To accomplish its mission, NAVASA uses a three-pronged approach, involving the strengthening of the program's development of member-organizations by providing technical assistance, leadership training, and resource development assistance; delivering services to those in need through collaborative efforts with local affiliates throughout the United States; and advocating on a national level for issues of importance to the Vietnamese-American population.
